"Snake" is a song by the American recording artist R. Kelly, featuring Big Tigger, from his fifth studio album, Chocolate Factory. The remix features Cam'ron. It was released on February 25, 2003, by Jive Records as the second single from the album. The R&B song with Latin music inspiration was written and produced by R. Kelly, and co-written by Darian Morgan, as a tribute to Stevie Wonder's musical experimentation. The song also inspired the dancehall reggae riddim called Baghdad.

"Snake" achieved moderate success, reaching number sixteen at the United States' Hot 100, and the tenth position on the United Kingdom. A special double-A-side edition with "Thoia Thoing" was also released. The maxi-single charted at number ten in the Netherlands, number thirty in France, number sixteen in Australia and at number eighteen in Switzerland. A remix with actor and musician Cam'ron was also released.

Background and composition

"Snake" was written and produced by R. Kelly, and co-written by Darian Morgan. It is an R&B song with Latin music inspiration, and elements of urban pop and new jack swing. "Snake" is four minutes and fifty-one seconds long. It is composed in the key of A♭ major and is set in time signature of common time with a tempo of 92 beats per minute. R. Kelly vocal range spans from C4 to F5. Andrew McGregor of the BBC revealed that "Snake" was written in "tribute to Stevie [Wonder]'s musical experimentation". Robert Christgau describes the song as an "Orientalist sex fantasy".

Music video
The music videos for both the original and the remix were directed by Little X.

Promotion
R. Kelly and Big Tigger performed the song together during many live performances (including at Madison Square Garden in New York on the penultimate concert) during his 2003 tour and during the 2003 BET Awards. "Snake" received a special double A-side edition with "Thoia Thoing". 
The maxi-single charted at number ten in the Netherlands, number thirty in France, number sixteen in Australia and at number eighteen in Switzerland. A remix with Cam'ron was also released.

Remix controversy
Cam'ron took R. Kelly to court in 2005 claiming that he did not receive proper credit for his work on a remix of the song. Cam'ron filed a federal lawsuit in New York. He had apparently written the introduction to the remix, as well as a part of the third verse but his songwriting contribution was not mentioned in the copyright when the song was included on The R. in R&B Collection, Vol. 1, a greatest-hits album.

Track listing
European CD single
"Snake" (Radio Edit) – 4:20
"Snake" (Remix Featuring Big Tigger and Cam'ron) – 4:40
"Dream Girl" – 3:57
"Snake" (Music Video) – 4:14

12" Vinyl
"Snake" (Radio Edit) – 4:20
"Dream Girl" – 3:57
"Snake" (Remix Featuring Big Tigger and Cam'ron) – 4:40

CD single
"Snake" (Radio Edit) – 4:20
"Snake" (Radio Edit Without Rap) – 3:34
"Snake" (Instrumental) – 4:52

Charts

Weekly charts

Year-end charts

Credits and personnel

 R. Kelly – vocals, audio mixing, producer, songwriter
 Big Tigger – vocals
 Darian Morgan – songwriter
 Donnie Lyle – instruments
 Rodney East – instruments
 Abel Garibaldi – programming
 Andy Gallas – programming
 Ian Mereness – programming

 Jason Mlodzinski – programming
 Nathan Wheeler – programming
 Steve Bearsley – programming
 Larry Phillabaum – engineering
 Tim Roberts – engineering
 John Hanes – engineering
 Serban Ghenea – audio mixing
 Swizz Beatz – audio mixing

Credits adapted from CD single liner notes.

References

2003 singles
R. Kelly songs
Songs written by R. Kelly
Song recordings produced by R. Kelly
Music videos directed by Director X